Phakopsora pachyrhizi is a plant pathogen. It causes Asian soybean rust.

Hosts 
Phakopsora pachyrhizi is an obligate biotrophic pathogen that causes Asian soybean rust. Phakopsora pachyrhizi is able to affect up to 31 different plant species that belong to 17 different genera under natural conditions. Experiments in laboratories were able to use Phakopsora pachyrhizi to infect 60 more plant species. The main hosts are Glycine max (soybean), Glycine soja (wild soybean), and Pachyrhizus erosus (Jicama).

*Preferred hosts. Other hosts were minor or determined experimentally under artificial conditions.

Symptoms 
The disease forms tan to dark-brown or reddish-brown lesions with one to many prominent, globe-like orifices. Urediniospores form from these pores. At initial stages, small yellow spots are formed on the surface of the leaf. These spots may be better observed using assistance of a light source. As the disease progresses, lesions start to form on the leaves, stems, pod, and petioles. Lesions are initially small, turning from gray to tan or brown as they increase in size and the disease gets more severe. Soon volcano-shaped marks are noticed in the lesions.

Disease cycle 
Phakopsora pachyrhizi is a fungus which has a spore moved by wind, called urediniospore. These spores are quite different from others as they don't need an open stomata or natural openings in the leaves. Urediniospores are able to penetrate the leaf. Pustules are visible after 10 days and they can produce spores for three weeks. The disease reaches its climax when the crop begins flowering. The cycle of the pathogen continues until the crop is defoliated or until the environment becomes unfavorable to the pathogen.

The Asian soybean rust is a polycyclic disease: within the disease cycle, the asexual urediniospores keep infecting the same plant. Teliospores (sexual spores) are the survival spores that overwinter in the soil. Basidiospores are the spores that are able to contaminate an alternative host. The urediniospores need a minimum of six hours to infect leaves at a favorable temperature (between 15 and 24 °C).

Environment 
The favorable conditions for the disease to progress are related to temperature, humidity, and wind. The appropriate temperature for the pathogen to be active is 12 to 29 °C (more efficient between 18 and 26.5 °C). The humidity must be high, about 90% or more, for more than 12 hours. A significant amount of wind is also important for the pathogen to move from one plant to the other. Currently, in the United States, infected plants can be found in Florida, Georgia, Louisiana, and Texas.

Risk factors 
Uredospores are wind-blown and are produced abundantly on the infected tissue of soybeans or other legume hosts.

Management 
The disease is often controlled using the fungicides oxycarboxin, triforine, and triclopyr.

Phakospsora pachyrhizi is a pathogen that acts quickly in contaminating the host. The plant can be severely contaminated in as short a period as 10 days. This makes it difficult to control the disease, as it does not just spread quickly, but its progression is also fast. That is why it is important to implement control techniques as soon as possible.

Genetic resistance 
The disease may be controlled by using genetic resistance, but this has not exhibited great results and has not been durable because the soybean genome almost entirely lacks potential genes for ASR resistance. A gene from Cajanus cajan has shown promise when transferred to soybean. This method could be expanded to a wide array of genes in the entire family; as with native genes these are best deployed in combination due to P. pachyrhizi's ability to rapidly overcome resistance.

Chemical control 
A second form of management that can work is using fungicides, but this is only efficient at early stages of the disease. The disease spreads fast and it is complicated to control after certain stages, so it is important to act with care around contaminated plants, as the spores can be attached to clothing and other materials and infect other plants.

References

External links 
 USDA ARS Fungal Database

Fungal plant pathogens and diseases
Soybean diseases
Pucciniales
Fungi described in 1914
Taxa named by Hans Sydow
Taxa named by Paul Sydow